The Osmanoğlu family are the members of the historical House of Osman (the Ottoman dynasty), which was the namesake and sole ruling house of the Ottoman Empire from 1299 until the establishment of the Republic of Turkey in 1923.

There were 36 Ottoman sultans who ruled over the Empire, and each one was a direct descendant through the male line of the first Ottoman Sultan, Sultan Osman I. After the deposition of the last Sultan, Mehmed VI, in 1922, and the subsequent abolition of the Ottoman Caliphate in 1924, members of the Imperial family were forced into exile. Their descendants now live in many different countries throughout Europe, as well as in the United States, the Middle East, and since they have now been permitted to return to their homeland, many now also live in Turkey. When in exile, the family adopted the surname of Osmanoğlu, meaning "son of Osman", after the founder of the House of Osman and direct ancestor of all current family members.

Heads of the House of Osman since 1923 
The Ottoman dynasty was exiled from Turkey in 1924. The female members of the dynasty were allowed to return after 1951, and the male members after 1973. Below is a list of people who would have been heirs to the Ottoman throne following the abolition of the sultanate on 1 November 1922. These people have not necessarily made any claim to the throne; for example Ertuğrul Osman said "Democracy works well in Turkey.".

 Mehmed VI, last Ottoman Sultan (1918–1922) then 36th Head of the House of Osman in exile (1922–1926).
 Abdulmejid II, cousin of Mehmed VI. Last Ottoman Caliph (1922–1924) then 37th Head of the House of Osman following Mehmed VI Vahideddin's death (1926–1944).
 Ahmed Nihad, 38th Head of the House of Osman (1944–1954), grandson of Sultan Murad V.
 Osman Fuad, 39th Head of the House of Osman (1954–1973), half-brother of Ahmed IV Nihad.
 Mehmed Abdulaziz, 40th Head of the House of Osman (1973–1977), grandson of Sultan Abdulaziz.
 Ali Vâsib, 41st Head of the House of Osman (1977–1983), son of Ahmed IV Nihad.
 Mehmed Orhan, 42nd Head of the House of Osman (1983–1994), grandson of Sultan Abdul Hamid II.
 Ertuğrul Osman, 43rd Head of the House of Osman (1994–2009), grandson of Sultan Abdul Hamid II. He is known in Turkey as "the Last Ottoman".
 Bayezid Osman, 44th Head of the House of Osman (2009–2017), great-grandson of Sultan Abdulmejid I.
 Dündar Ali Osman, 45th Head of the House of Osman (2017–2021), great-grandson of Sultan Abdul Hamid II.
 Harun Osman, 46th Head of the House of Osman (2021–present), great-grandson of Sultan Abdul Hamid II.

Current head 

Harun Osman Osmanoğlu (born 22 January 1932) is the current Head of the House of Osman.

Osman's father was Şehzade Mehmed Abdülkerim, the only son of Şehzade Mehmed Selim, the eldest son of Abdul Hamid II. In 1924, when members of the Ottoman dynasty were expelled, they left to Beirut. Mehmed Abdülkerim died in 1935 in Damascus and left his two children, born in 1930 and 1932 orphans at a young age. Osman's grandfather Mehmed Selim died in 1937. The family returned to Istanbul from exile in Damascus in 1974, just after the dynasty members were allowed to return to their homeland. Osman became the Head of the Ottoman dynasty in 2021 upon the death of his older brother, Dündar Osmanoğlu. He lives in Istanbul and has nine grandchildren.

On the death of his brother, Turkish President Recep Tayyip Erdoğan telephoned Harun Osman to give his condolences to the family. According to TRT's French website: "Osmanoglu thanked President Erdoğan and said he had always prayed for him. The series 'Payitaht Abdulhamit' broadcast on TRT 1 was discussed during the telephone interview. Harun Osmanoglu said he is following the series."

Harun is married to Farizet Hanım, by whom he has two sons and one daughter:

 Şehzade Orhan Osmanoğlu (born Damascus, 25 August 1963), married on 22 December 1985 to Nuran Yıldız Hanım (born 1967), and has one son and four daughters:
 Nilhan Osmanoğlu Sultan (born Istanbul, 25 April 1987), married in Istanbul on 22 September 2012 to Damat Mehmet Behlül Vatansever, and has one daughter and one son:
 Hanzade Hanımsultan Vatansever (born 2 July 2013)
 Sultanzade Mehmet Vahdettin Vatansever (born 14 October 2014)
 Şehzade Yavuz Selim Osmanoğlu (born Istanbul, 22 February 1989), married on 4 July 2021 to Damla Işık;
 Nilüfer Osmanoğlu Sultan (born Istanbul, 5 May 1995), married on 12 June 2021 to Melih Baştuğ;
 Berna Osmanoğlu Sultan (born Istanbul, 1 October 1998)
 Asyahan Osmanoğlu Sultan (born Istanbul, ... ... 2004)
 Nurhan Osmanoğlu Sultan (born Damascus, 20 November 1973), married firstly in Istanbul on 15 April 1994 and later divorced Damat Samir Hashem Bey (born 24 January 1959), without issue, and married secondly to Damat Muhammed Ammar Sagherji Bey (born 1972), and has one son and one daughter:
 Sultanzade Muhammed Halil Sagherji Bey (born 2002)
 Sara Sagherji Hanımsultan (born 2004)
 Şehzade Abdulhamid Kayıhan Osmanoğlu Efendi (born 4 August 1979), married Walaa Osmanoğlu, and has two sons:
 Şehzade Harun Osmanoğlu Efendi (born 1 December 2007)
 Şehzade Abdülaziz Osmanoğlu Efendi (born 12 August 2016)

Resurgence of interest in the Ottoman family

Since the turn of the 21st century there has been a growing interest in the living members of the Ottoman family, both within Turkey and abroad.

In 2006, family members met at Dolmabahçe Palace for the presentation of the documentary Osmanoğlu'nun Sürgünü (The Ottomans' Exile) produced by TRT (Turkish Radio and Television Corporation). This documentary followed the stories of the members of the Ottoman family who went into exile in 1924, following the establishment of the Turkish Republic and the abolition of the Ottoman Caliphate. It then follows the stories of their descendants, who now live in Turkey, Europe, North America, and throughout the Middle East. Extensive coverage of this event, and the success of the documentary series has dramatically raised the profile of the Imperial Family.

According to The New York Times, historians said that the show of reverence at the funeral of Imperial Prince Ertuğrul Osman in September 2009 was a "seminal moment in the rehabilitation of the Ottoman Empire".

The popularity of the historical television series Payitaht Abdulhami about the Ottoman Empire has grown significantly in recent years in Turkey, and the Turkish government under Erdoğan has encouraged a nostalgia for the greatness of the former empire, which is sometimes referred to as 'Neo-Ottomanism'.

An interview with Imperial Prince Mahmud by the Anatolian News Agency was published in several publications in Turkey and the UK. A Sultan's descendant in the heart of London

Turkish citizenship
Without exception, all high-ranking members of the Imperial Ottoman family were exiled in 1924. Most had never left their homeland before, and all were forced to make a new life abroad. The family departed from Sirkeci railway station, and would disperse across Europe, the United States and the Middle East. In exile, the family lived in poverty. As the former Ottoman Sultan Mehmed VI Vahideddin had settled in San Remo, many members of the family congregated in the South of France. After living in Switzerland for a short time, the last Caliph of Islam, Imperial Prince (Şehzade) Abdulmecid II, also moved to the French Riviera, settling in Nice. The Turkish Republic had issued the exiled Ottoman family members with travel documents but they were only valid for one year. Therefore, by 1925 members of the family were no longer able to travel. Prince (Şehzade) Ali Vâsib Efendi appealed to the French Government and succeeded in obtaining courtesy passports for them. The French Government also issued passports to the children of the members of the family who were born in exile. In the years since the exile was lifted in 1973, many members of the Ottoman family have obtained Turkish citizenship and hold Turkish passports.

Imperial Princes (Şehzades) of the House of Osman 
The formal way of addressing the male descendants of the Ottoman Sultans is Devletlu Necabetlu Şehzade Sultan (given name) Hazretleri Efendi, i.e. Sultan Imperial Prince (given name). According to genealogies of the House of Osman, had the Sultanate not been abolished, there would be twenty-five Imperial Princes in the line of succession after Dundar Ali Osman (2017-2021), the late head of the family. The succession law used is agnatic seniority, with the succession passing to eldest male dynast.

Şehzade Harun Osman Efendi (b. 1932) (descendant of Abdul Hamid II)
Şehzade Osman Selaheddin Osmanoğlu Efendi (b. 1940) (descendant of Murad V through Ahmed IV and Ali I, and of Mehmed V through Ömer Hilmi)
Şehzade Ömer Abdülmecid Osmanoğlu Efendi (b. 1941) (descendant of Mehmed V through Ömer Hilmi and Mahmud Namık)
Şehzade Mehmed Ziyaeddin Efendi (b. 1947) (descendant of Mehmed V)
Şehzade Roland Selim Kadir Efendi (b. 1949) (descendant of Abdul Hamid II)
Şehzade Selim Djem Efendi (b. 1955) (descendant of Abdülmecid I)
Şehzade Orhan İbrahim Suleiman Saadeddin Efendi (b. 1959) (descendant of Abdulaziz)
Şehzade Mustafa Kemal Stockley Efendi (b. 1961) (descendant of Abdul Hamid II)<Gündüz>
Şehzade Orhan Osmanoğlu Efendi (b. 1963) (descendant of Abdul Hamid II)
Şehzade Eric Mehmed Ziyaeddin Nazim Efendi (b. 1966) (descendant of Mehmed V)
Şehzade Orhan Murad Osmanoğlu Efendi (b. 1972) (descendant of Murad V through Ahmed IV and Ali I, and of Mehmed V through Ömer Hilmi)
Şehzade Francis Mahmud Namık Osmanoğlu Efendi (b. 1975) (descendant of Mehmed V through Ömer Hilmi and Mahmud Namık)
Şehzade René Osman Abdul Kadir Efendi (b. 1975) (descendant of Abdul Hamid II)
Şehzade Daniel Adrian Abdulhamid Kadir Efendi (b. 1977) (descendant of Abdul Hamid II)
Şehzade Abdulhamid Kayıhan Osmanoğlu Efendi (b. 1979) (descendant of Abdul Hamid II)
Şehzade Selim Süleyman Osmanoğlu Efendi (b. 1979) (descendant of Murad V through Ahmed IV , and of Mehmed V through Ömer Hilmi)
Şehzade Nazım Osmanoğlu Efendi (b. 1985) (descendant of Mehmed V)
Şehzade Yavuz Selim Osmanoğlu Efendi (b. 1989) (descendant of Abdul Hamid II)
Şehzade Radeen Rahman 
Osmanoğlu Efendi (b. 2004) (descendant of Murad V through Ahmed IV )
Şehzade Tamer Nihad Osmanoğlu Efendi (b. 2006) (descendant of Murad V through Ahmed IV )
Şehzade Muhammed Harun Osmanoğlu Efendi (b. 2007) (descendant of Abdul Hamid II)
Şehzade Batu Bayezid Osmanoğlu Efendi (b. 2008) (descendant of Murad V through Ahmed IV )
Şehzade Ziyaeddin Reşad Osmanoğlu Efendi (b. 2012) (descendant of Mehmed V through Ömer Hilmi and Mahmud Namık)
Şehzade Cem Ömer Osmanoğlu Efendi (b. 2015) (descendant of Mehmed V through Ömer Hilmi and Mahmud Namık)
Şehzade Abdülaziz Osmanoğlu Efendi (b. 2016) (grand son of Harun Osman and descendant of Abdul Hamid II) |url=https://dzen.ru/a/YKI7A0uNgQZb8l_Q |access-date=2022-12-10 |website=Дзен  Блогерская платформа |language=ru}}</ref>

Imperial Princesses (Sultanas) of the House of Osman 
The formal way of addressing the female descendants of the Ottoman Sultans is Devletlû İsmetlu (given name) Sultân Aliyyetü'ş-Şân Hazretleri, i.e. Sultana (given name). According to genealogies of the House of Osman, had the Sultanate not been abolished, there would be fourteen Sultanas:

Margot Leyla Osmanoğlu Sultan (b. 1947) (descendant of Abdul Hamid II) 
Nilüfer Osmanoğlu Sultan (b. 1953) (descendant of Abdülmecid I)
Perihan Osmanoğlu Sultan (b. 1963) (descendant of Abdülaziz)
Ayşe Louise Osmanoğlu Sultan (b. 1964) (descendant of Mehmed V) 
Gülhan Osmanoğlu Sultan (b. 1968) (descendant of Abdülaziz)
Ayşe Gülnev Osmanoğlu Sultan (b. 1971) (descendant of Murad V through Ahmed IV and Ali I, and of Mehmed V through Ömer Hilmi) 
Nurhan Eva Osmanoğlu Sultan (b. 1970) (descendant of Abdul Hamid II)
Nilhan Osmanoğlu Sultan (b. 1987) (descendant of Abdul Hamid II)
Zoe Osmanoğlu Sultan (b. 1988) (descendant of Mehmed V)
Suzan Osmanoğlu Sultan (b. 1997, The Netherlands) (descendant of Abdul Hamid II)
Ridwan Osmanoğlu Sultan (b. 1998) (descendant of Abdul Hamid II)
Berna Osmanoğlu Sultan (b. 1999) (descendant of Abdul Hamid II)
Asyahan Osmanoğlu Sultan (b. 2004) (descendant of Abdul Hamid II)
Esma Emira Osmanoğlu Sultan (b. 2015) (descendant of Murad V through Ahmed IV and Ali I, and of Mehmed V through Ömer Hilmi)

See also 
 Ottoman dynasty, the historical form of the family

References 

 
Turkish families
Hanafis
Maturidis